 

Walter Karl Friedrich Assmann (22 July 1896 – 1 May 1964) was a German general in the Wehrmacht of Nazi Germany during World War II who commanded the 101. Jäger Division. He was a recipient of the Knight's Cross of the Iron Cross.

Awards and decorations

 German Cross in Gold on 25 April 1942 as Oberstleutnant in Infanterie-Regiment 478
 Knight's Cross of the Iron Cross on 10 February 1945 as Generalmajor and commander of 101. Jäger-Division

References

Citations

Bibliography

 
 

1896 births
1964 deaths
People from Mühlhausen
People from the Province of Saxony
Lieutenant generals of the German Army (Wehrmacht)
German Army personnel of World War I
Recipients of the clasp to the Iron Cross, 1st class
Recipients of the Gold German Cross
Recipients of the Knight's Cross of the Iron Cross
German prisoners of war in World War II held by the United States
German dentists
Prussian Army personnel
20th-century Freikorps personnel
20th-century dentists